Manduca florestan, the Florestan sphinx, is a moth of the family Sphingidae. The species was first described by Caspar Stoll in 1782.

Distribution 
It is found from the mountains of southern Arizona, New Mexico, and the lower Rio Grande Valley of southern Texas through Mexico, Belize, Guatemala, Nicaragua, Costa Rica and the rest of Central America south into South America at least to Paraguay, Bolivia, Venezuela, Argentina, Brazil and Suriname. they have also been spotted in N.S.W Australia.

Description 

The wingspan is 99–110 mm. It is similar in appearance to several other members of the genus Manduca, but a number of differences distinguish it from Manduca lichenea, to which it most closely compares. There is a great deal of individual variation. The forewings have a greenish tint and prominent black discal streaks.

Biology 
There is one generation with adults on wing from late June to early August in the United States. In Bolivia, adults have been reported in March and again from October to December, while adults are on wing year round in Costa Rica. They feed on the nectar of various flowers, including Plumeria rubra in Costa Rica.

The larvae feed on Tecoma and Citharexylum species, Stachytarpheta frantzii, Callicarpa acuminata, Aegiphylla martinicensis, Citharexylum costaricensis, Tabebuia ochracea, Callichlamys latifolia, Cydista heterophylla, Cydista diversifolia, Crescentia alata, Macfadyena unguis-cati, Cordia panamensis, Cordia alliodora and Chionentis panamensis. In Brazil, larvae have been reported on Lantana camara, Pyrostegia venusta and Vitex megapotamica.

References

External links

Manduca florestan Moths of North America

Manduca
Moths described in 1782
Sphingidae of South America
Moths of South America